Naaah, Dis Kid Can't Be from Canada?!! (stylized as "Naaah, Dis Kid Can't be from Canada?!!") is the fourth studio album by Canadian rapper Maestro Fresh-Wes, released in 1994 on Attic/LMR Records. Singles from the album include "Fine Tune da Mic" and "Certs wid Out da Retsyn". Most of the production was handled by Maestro, with contributions from D.I.T.C. member Showbiz.

Reception 

RapReviews.com gave the album an 8.5/10 rating and praised its underground sound, calling it "anything but a commercial album." Maestro also changed his image to reflect hip hop fashion in the mid-1990s; "Gone was the tuxedo, replaced by a hoodie."

The album was a commercial failure and after its release, many members of Toronto's hip-hop community began dissing Maestro. However, it was nominated for Best Rap Recording at the 1995 Juno Awards.

Track listing

Personnel 
 Alex Armitage – Assistant Engineer  
 Reid Butscher – Assistant Engineer  
 Chris Conway – Engineer, Mixing  
 Chris Gehringer – Mastering  
 Graham Kennedy – Photography  
 Maestro Fresh-Wes – Producer, Performer  
 Liz Mercado – Assistant  Engineer  
 Anton Pukshansky – Bass, Producer, Engineer, Mixing  
 Showbiz – Producer  
 W. Williams – Lyricist  
 Nicole Willis – Photography  
 Dino Zervous – Assistant Engineer

References 

1994 albums
Maestro Fresh-Wes albums
Attic Records albums
Albums produced by Showbiz (producer)